Adelaide Writers' Week, known locally as Writers' Week or WW, is a large and mostly free literary festival held annually in Adelaide, the capital of South Australia. Considered one of the world's pre-eminent literary events, it forms part of the Adelaide Festival of Arts, where attendees meet, listen and discuss literature with Australian and international writers in "Meet the Author" sessions, readings and lectures. It is held outdoors in the Pioneer Women's Memorial Garden.

Each Adelaide Writers' Week includes six days of free panel-sessions presented live in the gardens, later made available online via podcast. Selected sessions are shown live via videolink in some libraries. The programme also features a series of ticketed special events, both at Festival time and throughout the year, and there is a free "Kids' Weekend", at which children's authors present their work for a range of ages and other activities take place.

History
The first Adelaide Writers' Week was held in 1960 as part of the Adelaide Festival of Arts, and both were held biennially in March until 2012. From 2012, along with the Festival, Writers' Week became an annual event, based on an election promise by Premier Mike Rann. It has grown bigger year by year.

Description
Writers' Week is a mostly free daytime week-long literary festival held mostly outdoors in the shady Pioneer Women's Memorial Garden, north of Adelaide CBD. A few sessions have been held indoors in the evening, usually themed events with a panel of authors on stage.

A major event, it is a part of the Adelaide Festival and run by a dedicated Writers' Week director. Occurring in March, it is often hot, so huge shady structures are erected over the two stages (East and West) and the audience. Plastic chairs, refreshments and rows of portaloos are provided, along with a large tent accommodating book sales. The programme is published in hardcopy and online before the event, which runs a session on both stages simultaneously throughout the day, with short breaks in between.

Each Adelaide Writers’ Week includes six days of free panel sessions presented live in the gardens, later made available online via podcast. Selected sessions are shown live via videolink in some libraries. After each presentation, audience members are encouraged to ask questions, and lively debate sometimes ensues. The programme also features a series of ticketed special events, both at Festival time and throughout the year, and there is a free "Kids’ Weekend", at which children's authors present their work for a range of ages and other activities are held.

MUD Literary Prize

The MUD Literary Prize has been awarded to an emerging talent for a debut novel at Writers' Week each year since 2018, and the MUD Literary Club, a philanthropic organisation dedicated to Australian literature, also sponsors an established author as well as an emerging author at the event each year.

Directors
Directors of Writers' Week have included Rose Wight (for 17 years, 1993?–2012); New York state-born Laura Kroetsch (2012–2018), Jo Dyer (2019–2021); and Melbourne publisher Louise Adler (2022–2025).

Featured writers by year

2019
The event took place from 2–7 March. Australian authors included Trent Dalton (winner of the MUD Literary Prize), Natasha Stott Despoja, Chloe Hooper, David Stratton, Melissa Lucashenko, Ben Quilty, Eddie Woo, David Marr, David Malouf, Ceridwen Dovey, Sue Blacklock, Lyndall Ryan and Jane Harper.

International authors included Ben Okri, Kassem Eid, Oyinkan Braithwaite, Carl Zimmer, Mohammed Hanif, Nazanin Sahamizadeh, Ndaba Mandela and Marlene van Niekerk. JM Coetzee chaired the session with Van Niekerk.

2018
Adelaide Writers' Week in 2018 featured Mem Fox, Clive Hamilton, Barbara Kingsolver, Eva Hornung, Amal Awad and Jackie French.

2017
Adelaide Writers' Week in 2017 featured Caroline Baum, Paula Byrne, Richard Fidler, Emily Maguire, Melina Marchetta and Alejandro Zambra.

2016
Featured international and Australian authors at the 2016 Adelaide Writers' Week included Richard Dawkins, Fiona McFarlane, Drusilla Modjeska, Simon Winchester and Charlotte Wood.

2015
The 2015 Adelaide Writers' Week featured international and Australian authors including James Bradley, Helen Garner, Sofie Laguna, Kate Llewellyn, Susan Mitchell and Nicholas Shakespeare.

2014
Adelaide Writers' Week in 2014 featured international best sellers and emerging writers including Alexis Wright,  
Andy Griffiths, Margaret Drabble, Elizabeth Gilbert, Alexander McCall Smith and Marcus Chown.

2013
2013 was the first annual Adelaide Writers' Week. The most pronounced theme was that of war stories featuring visiting artists that included Tom Holland, Kevin Powers, Tatjana Soli and Madeleine Thien.

2012
Adelaide Writers' Week in 2012 saw a focus on younger readers hosting the first Kid's Program. A larger non-fiction program was included featuring artists Javier Cercas, Kate Grenville, Les Murray and Alan Hollinghurst.

2010
Adelaide Writers' Week in 2010 featured a collection of established overseas and Australian writers including Richard Dawkins, Audrey Niffengger, William Dalrymple and Robert Dessaix

2008
2008's Writers' Week was held between 2 March and 7 March 2008 and featured a number of prize-winning authors, including Ian McEwan, Peter Carey, Paul Auster, Geraldine Brooks, and Tim Parks. Other notable authors included feminist Germaine Greer, British historian Richard Holmes, Sri Lanka native Roma Tearne, and American author Siri Hustvedt.  Australian authors included poet and novelist David Malouf, Robyn Davidson, Tumby Bay native Kate Llewellyn, Matt Rubinstein, Looking for Alibrandi author Melina Marchetta, and actor and novelist William McInnes.

2006
2006's Writers' Week focused on Dutch and Indian writing and was held between 5 March and 10 March 2006. Notable visiting authors included Pulitzer Prize winning author Michael Cunningham, crime novelists Val McDermid, Andrew Taylor and Minette Walters and Indian author Vikram Seth. Australian authors included historian professor Geoffrey Blainey and Adelaidean Peter Goldsworthy

2005
In 2005, visiting authors included Isabel Allende, Margaret Atwood, Ruth Rendell and Neal Stephenson.

2004
Authors included Ruth Rendell, Janette Turner Hospital, Clive James, Don Watson, Anne Enright, John Marsden and JM Coetzee.

1996
Writers' Week took place 3–8 March. Visiting authors included E. Annie Proulx, JM Coetzee, James Ellroy and Adrian Edmondson. Australian authors included Rodney Hall, Tim Flannery, Glenda Adams, Lily Brett, Kate Grenville, Marion Halligan, Gail Jones, singer Paul Kelly, and Tim Winton.

1982
Writers' Week took place 7–13 March. Featured writers included Neil Armfield, Thea Astley, Blanche d'Alpuget, Helen Garner, Peter Goldsworthy, David Hare, Jeri Kroll, Thomas Shapcott, Colin Thiele, Judith Wright and Fay Weldon.

See also
 South Australian Living Artists Festival
 Adelaide Festival Awards for Literature

References

Further reading
 (full text)

External links
 

Writers
Literary festivals in Australia
Festivals established in 1960
1960 establishments in Australia
March events